Ramularia ulmariae is a fungal species described by Cooke in 1876. Ramularia ulmariae belongs to the genus Ramularia and the family Mycosphaerellaceae. No subspecies are listed in the Catalog of Life.

This fungus is a pathogen of meadowsweet (Filipendula ulmaria) that causes purple spots on the plant's leaves and is most evident in summer.  It produces translucent, cylindrical conidia with up to two septa.

Ramularia ulmariae has been reported from Europe and also the western coast of North America. However its presence is probably under-recorded.

References

Fungal strawberry diseases
Fungi described in 1876
ulmariae
Taxa named by Mordecai Cubitt Cooke